The 2012 Caloundra International was a professional tennis tournament played on hard courts. It was the sixth edition of the tournament which was part of the 2012 ATP Challenger Tour. It took place in Caloundra, Australia between 6 and 12 February 2012.

ATP entrants

Seeds

 1 Rankings are as of 30 January 2012.

Other entrants
The following players received wildcards into the singles main draw:
  Colin Ebelthite
  Adam Feeney
  Luke Saville
  Andrew Whittington

The following players received entry from the qualifying draw:
  Maverick Banes
  Matthew Barton
  Nick Lindahl
  Nima Roshan

Champions

Singles

 Marinko Matosevic def.  Greg Jones, 6–0, 6–2

Doubles

 John Peers /  John-Patrick Smith def.  John Paul Fruttero /  Raven Klaasen, 7–6(7–5), 6–4

External links
Official Website
ITF Search
ATP official site